Memoirs of a Nun (German: Erinnerungen einer Nonne) is a 1927 German silent drama film directed by Arthur Bergen and starring Mary Nolan.

The film's sets were designed by the art director Ludwig Reiber. It was made at the Emelka Studios in Berlin.

Cast
 Mary Nolan
 Camilla von Hollay 
 Werner Pittschau 
 Ellen Kürti 
 Georg John

References

External links

1927 films
Films of the Weimar Republic
Films directed by Arthur Bergen
German silent feature films
German black-and-white films
German drama films
1927 drama films
Bavaria Film films
Films shot at Bavaria Studios
Silent drama films
1920s German films